Gabriel Lory the Younger, also known as Mathias Gabriel Lori (21 June 1784, Bern - 25 August 1846, Bern), was a Swiss landscape painter, etcher, watercolorist and illustrator. His father was the painter, Gabriel Lory the Elder.

Biography 

He received his lessons in art from his father. In 1797, he moved with him to Herisau, where he assisted him with his projects. In 1805, he travelled with him again; this time to Neuchâtel, where he helped him edit the Voyage pittoresque de Genève à Milan par le Simplon. It was there that he made friends with the painter, Maximilien de Meuron, who he accompanied on trips to Paris and Italy.

In 1812, he married Henriette-Louise de Meuron von Orbe, a relative of his friend. Soon, he was able to find a position as a teacher in Neuchâtel, for the city schools, while Henriette acted as his publisher. He also made the acquaintance of the banker, Count , who became his new travelling partner on his excursions to Italy.

Both of their children died in 1819. After that, he and Henriette spent their summers in Bern and their winters in Neuchâtel. Over the next few years, together with César Henri Montvert (1784–1848), he published several works depicting traditional Swiss costumes and views of the Bernese Oberland. In 1828, he paid another visit to Paris, and was received at Court.

In 1832, he settled permanently in Bern and became a member of the local artists' society; although he continued to travel throughout Switzerland and Italy. During the winters of 1834/35 and 1835/36, he was in Berlin. There, he given the largely honorary title of Associate Professor at the Academy of Arts. 

In the 1840s, his health began to decline, so he started spending his winters in Nice. In 1846, he spent some time in Frankfurt am Main with his friend and former student, Gerhardt Wilhelm von Reutern. Shortly after returning home, he died of a heart attack.

Sources

Further reading 
 Conrad von Mandach: Deux peintres suisses : Gabriel Lory le père (1763–1840) et Gabriel Lory le fils (1784–1846). Haeschel-Dufey, Lausanne 1920. Reprinted by Éditions Slatkine, Geneva 1978,

External links 

 More works by Lory @ ArtNet

1784 births
1846 deaths
Swiss landscape painters
Swiss etchers
Swiss watercolourists
Swiss illustrators
Artists from Bern